The Unity Cup is an association football competition run by the Yemen Football Association (YFA). It initially started in the 1997-98 season and played for two years before being put on hold. The competition was added back to the Yemeni football calendar in 2004, again stopped but brought back in 2007 and has been played every season ever since.

Finals

External links 
 Unity Cup results RSSSF

 
Unity
Recurring sporting events established in 1997
1990s establishments in Yemen